Palaeomystella tavaresi is a moth of the family Agonoxenidae. It is found in the Atlantic Forest at the Serra Bonita Reserve in Brazil.

The length of the forewings is 7.02-9.23 mm. The forewings are covered by brown scales dorsally, intermixed with dark-brown scales tipped with black, and pale-brown scales. There is a narrow, ill-defined, dark-brown streak which bisects the wing longitudinally from the base to a brown, subapical, crescentic marking, edged distally with dark-grey scales. The hindwings are covered with light brown scales on both sides.

The larvae feed on Tibouchina fissinervia. They create a gall on their host plant.

Gallery

Etymology
The species is named in honor of the Jesuit priest Joaquim da Silva Tavares, a Portuguese naturalist and a pioneer in the study and description of Brazilian cecidology.

References

Moths described in 2014
Agonoxeninae
Moths of South America